Mucuqoba is a village in the municipality of Aşağı İmamqulukənd in the Qusar Rayon of Azerbaijan.

References

Populated places in Qusar District